IRAS 18162-2048 is a far-infrared source discovered by IRAS spacecraft in 1983. It is associated with a massive (~10 solar masses) protostar, which accretes gas from a disk that surrounds it. IRAS 18162-2048 emits two collimated radio jets along its axis of rotation. The jets are made of chains of radio sources aligned in a southwest-northeast direction. The northern jet terminates in Herbig–Haro object HH 81N, while the southern one terminates in Herbig–Haro objects HH 80 and HH 81. The total luminosity of IRAS 18162-2048 is about 17,000 solar luminosities. The total extent of this system of jets and radio sources is about 5 pc.

In 2010 HH 80–81 jet of IRAS 18162-2048 were found to emit polarized radio waves, which indicated that they were produced by relativistic electrons moving along the magnetic field estimated at 20 nT. This observation was the first of kind demonstrating that a protostar can have a magnetized jet.

References

Sagittarius (constellation)
Emission nebulae
Protostars
18162−2048
?